Pan American School or Panamerican School may refer to:

 Pan American School of Bahia, an American international school in Salvador, Bahia, Brazil
 Pan American School of Porto Alegre, an American international school in Petrópolis, Porto Alegre, Brazil
 Pan American International High School, Internationals Network for Public Schools
 Pan-American School of Agriculture or El Zamorano, San Antonio de Oriente, Francisco Morazán, Honduras

See also  
 PAS (disambiguation)